The sack of Constantinople occurred in April 1204 and marked the culmination of the Fourth Crusade. Crusader armies captured, looted, and destroyed parts of Constantinople, then the capital of the Byzantine Empire. After the capture of the city, the Latin Empire (known to the Byzantines as the Frankokratia or the Latin Occupation) was established and Baldwin of Flanders was crowned Emperor Baldwin I of Constantinople in the Hagia Sophia.

After the city's sacking, most of the Byzantine Empire's territories were divided up among the Crusaders. Byzantine aristocrats also established a number of small independent splinter states—one of them being the Empire of Nicaea, which would eventually recapture Constantinople in 1261 and proclaim the reinstatement of the Empire. However, the restored Empire never managed to reclaim its former territorial or economic strength, and eventually fell to the rising Ottoman Empire in the 1453 Siege of Constantinople.

The Byzantine Empire was left much poorer, smaller, and ultimately less able to defend itself against the Seljuk and Ottoman conquests that followed; the actions of the Crusaders thus directly accelerated the collapse of Christendom in the east, and in the long run helped facilitate the later Ottoman conquests of Southeastern Europe.

The sack of Constantinople is a major turning point in medieval history. The Crusaders' decision to attack the world's largest Christian city was unprecedented and immediately controversial. Reports of Crusader looting and brutality scandalized and horrified the Orthodox world; relations between the Catholic and Orthodox churches were catastrophically wounded for many centuries afterwards, and would not be substantially repaired until modern times.

Before the siege

The Massacre of the Latins, a massacre of the Roman Catholic or "Latin" inhabitants of Constantinople by the usurper Andronikos Komnenos and his supporters in May 1182, affected political relations between Western Europe and the Byzantine Empire and led to the sack of Thessalonica by Normans. Although regular trade agreements were soon resumed between Byzantine and Latin States, some Westerners sought some form of revenge. However, because of the previous siege of a Catholic Zara, revenge is disputable as a significant motive.

Following the siege of Constantinople in 1203, on 1 August 1203 the pro-Crusader Alexios Angelos was crowned Emperor Alexios IV of the Byzantine Empire. He attempted to pacify the city, but riots between anti-Crusader Greeks and pro-Crusader Latins broke out later that month and lasted until November, during which time most of the populace began to turn against him.

On 25 January 1204, the death of co-Emperor Isaac II set off rioting in Constantinople in which the people deposed Alexios IV.  He turned to the Crusaders for help, but was imprisoned by the imperial chamberlain, Alexios Doukas, who declared himself Emperor on 5 February before executing Alexios IV on 8 February by strangulation. Emperor Alexios V then attempted to negotiate with the Crusaders for a withdrawal from Byzantine territory without payment, but they refused in order to avenge Alexios IV and receive the money that was promised. In March 1204, the Crusader and Venetian leadership decided on the outright conquest of Constantinople in order to settle debts, and drew up a formal agreement to divide the Byzantine Empire between them.

Siege
By the end of March, the combined Crusader armies were besieging Constantinople as Emperor Alexios V began to strengthen the city's defences while conducting more active operations outside the city. By the first week of April, the Crusaders had begun their siege from their encampment in the town of Galata across the Golden Horn from Constantinople.

On 9 April 1204, the Crusader and Venetian forces began an assault on the Golden Horn fortifications by crossing the waterway to the northwest wall of the city, but, because of bad weather, the assault forces were driven back when the troops that landed came under heavy archery fire in open ground between Constantinople's fortifications and the shore.

Capture of the city

On 12 April 1204 weather conditions finally favoured the Crusaders as the weather cleared and a second assault on the city was ordered. A strong north wind aided the Venetian ships near the Golden Horn to come close to the city wall, which enabled attackers to seize some of the towers along the wall. After a short battle approximately 70 Crusaders managed to enter the city. Some Crusaders were eventually able to knock holes in the walls large enough for a few knights at a time to crawl through; the Venetians were also successful at scaling the walls from the sea, although there was extremely bloody fighting with the Varangians. The Crusaders captured the Blachernae section of the city in the northwest and used it as a base to attack the rest of the city, but while attempting to defend themselves with a wall of fire they ended up burning down even more of the city. Emperor Alexios V fled from the city that night through the Polyandriou (Rhegium) Gate and escaped into the countryside to the west.

Sack of Constantinople

The Crusaders looted, pillaged, and vandalized Constantinople for three days, during which many ancient and medieval Roman and Greek works were either seized or destroyed. The famous bronze horses from the Hippodrome were sent back to adorn the façade of St Mark's Basilica in Venice, where they remain. As well as being seized, works of considerable artistic value were destroyed for their material value. One of the most precious works to suffer such a fate was a large bronze statue of Hercules, created by the legendary Lysippos, court sculptor of Alexander the Great. Like so many other considerable artworks made of bronze, the statue was melted down for its content by the Crusaders for surplus profit.

Despite their oaths and the threat of excommunication, the Crusaders systematically assaulted the city's holy sanctuaries, destroying or seizing all that is deemed remotely of value; little was spared, and the tombs of the emperors inside the St Apostles church fell victim to such looting as well Of the civilian population of Constantinople, it is estimated 2,000 were killed. The Crusaders, with poor leadership, also sacked churches, monasteries and convents. The altars of these churches were smashed and torn to pieces for their gold and marble by the warriors. Although the Venetians engaged in looting too, their actions were more restrained.  Rather than destroying all around like their comrades, the Venetians stole religious relics and works of art, which they would later take to Venice to adorn their own churches.

It was said that the total amount looted from Constantinople was about 900,000 silver marks. The Venetians received 150,000 silver marks that was their due and the Crusaders received 50,000 silver marks. A further 100,000 silver marks were divided evenly between the Crusaders and Venetians. The remaining 500,000 silver marks were secretly kept back by many Crusader knights.

Aftermath
According to a prearranged treaty the empire was apportioned between Venice and the crusade's leaders, and the Latin Empire of Constantinople was established. Boniface was not elected as the new emperor, although the citizens seemed to consider him as such; the Venetians thought he had too many connections with the former empire because of his brother, Renier of Montferrat, who had been married to Maria Comnena, daughter and for a time heir-apparent of Manuel I. Instead they placed Baldwin of Flanders on the throne. He was crowned Emperor in the Hagia Sophia as Baldwin I of Constantinople. Boniface went on to found the Kingdom of Thessalonica, a vassal state of the new Latin Empire. The Venetians also founded the Duchy of the Archipelago in the Aegean Sea.

Most of the Byzantine aristocracy fled the city. Amongst the ordinary people of the former empire there was no sympathy for the Byzantine elite, who were seen as having ruled the empire with increasing incompetence. The contemporary Byzantine historian and eyewitness Nicetas Choniates closed his account of the fall of the city with the following description of a column of aristocratic refugees, including the Patriarch, making their way to Selymbria:

Byzantine aristocratic refugees founded their own successor states, the most notable of these being the Empire of Nicaea under Theodore Lascaris (a relative of Alexius III), the Empire of Trebizond and the Despotate of Epirus.

The sack weakened the Byzantine Empire, which allowed neighbouring groups such as the Sultanate of Rum, and later the Ottoman Turks, to gain influence (see the Byzantine–Ottoman Wars).

Apology

Eight hundred years after the Fourth Crusade, Pope John Paul II twice expressed sorrow for how the events transpired. In 2001 he wrote to Christodoulos, Archbishop of Athens, saying, "It is tragic that the assailants, who set out to secure free access for Christians to the Holy Land, turned against their brothers in the faith. The fact that they were Latin Christians fills Catholics with deep regret." In 2004, while Bartholomew I, Patriarch of Constantinople, was visiting the Vatican, John Paul II asked, "How can we not share, at a distance of eight centuries, the pain and disgust?" This has been regarded by some as an apology to the Greek Orthodox Church for the slaughter perpetrated by the warriors of the Fourth Crusade.

In April 2004, in a speech on the 800th anniversary of the capture of the city, Ecumenical Patriarch Bartholomew I formally accepted the apology. "The spirit of reconciliation is stronger than hatred," he said during a liturgy attended by Roman Catholic Archbishop Philippe Barbarin of Lyon, France. "We receive with gratitude and respect your cordial gesture for the tragic events of the Fourth Crusade. It is a fact that a crime was committed here in the city 800 years ago." Bartholomew said his acceptance came in the spirit of Pascha. "The spirit of reconciliation of the resurrection... incites us toward reconciliation of our churches."

See also
 Latinokratia
 Siege of Constantinople (1203)
 Siege of Constantinople (1235)
 Fall of Constantinople (1453)
 List of sieges

References

External links
 The Latin Occupation in the Greek Lands – The Latin Empire, from the Foundation of the Hellenic World
 

1204 in Europe
Conflicts in 1204
1200s in the Byzantine Empire
13th-century massacres
1204
Constantinople 1204
Constantinople 1204
Looting
Fall of the Byzantine Empire